Cyprus has sent athletes to every Olympic Games held since 1980. Cyprus earned its first Olympic medal in the 2012 Summer Olympics when Pavlos Kontides earned a silver medal in the men's laser sailing event. They had a near miss at the 2008 Olympics when Antonis Nikolaidis lost the bronze medal shoot-off in men's skeet. The first modern Olympian from Cyprus was actually Anastasios Andreou in 1896, who competed under the Greek flag.  At this time, Cyprus was a British colony.

Because the Turkish Republic of Northern Cyprus is not internationally recognized by any major authority (including the IOC), it has no Olympic committee.  Therefore, all Cypriot Olympians are required to compete under the name and flag of the Republic of Cyprus. Turkish Cypriots who are unable or unwilling to compete under the flag of the Republic of Cyprus either compete for Turkey, or for another country, or not at all.

Medal tables

Medals by Summer Games

Medals by Winter Games

Medals by sport

List of medalists

See also
 List of flag bearers for Cyprus at the Olympics
 :Category:Olympic competitors for Cyprus
 Cyprus at the Paralympics

References

External links